Mount Xuebaoding（; Tibetan name:Shar Dung Ri）is a mountain near the easternmost edge of the Tibetan Plateau in China. With an elevation of  it is the highest peak of the Min Mountains and the easternmost 5,500 m (18,000 ft) or higher peak on Earth. It is located in Songpan County of the Ngawa Tibetan and Qiang Autonomous Prefecture, Sichuan Province.

Xuebaoding was first climbed in 1986 by a Japanese team.

References

External links
 Mt. Xue Bao Ding (Shar Dung Ri)
 Itinerary (2010) Climbing Mount XueBaoDing, SiChuan

See also
 List of Ultras of Tibet and East Asia

Xuebaoding